Diotima of Mantinea is the name or pseudonym of an ancient Greek character in Plato's dialogue Symposium, possibly an actual historical figure, indicated as having lived circa 440 B.C. Her ideas and doctrine of Eros as reported by the character of Socrates in the dialogue are the origin of the concept today known as Platonic love.

Role in Symposium

In Plato's Symposium the members of a party discuss the meaning of love. Socrates says that in his youth he was taught "the philosophy of love" by Diotima, a prophetess who successfully postponed the Plague of Athens. In an account that Socrates recounts at the symposium, Diotima says that Socrates has confused the idea of love with the idea of the beloved. Love, she says, is neither fully beautiful nor good, as the earlier speakers in the dialogue had argued. Diotima gives Socrates a genealogy of Love (Eros), stating that he is the son of "resource (poros) and poverty (penia)". In her view, love drives the individual to seek beauty, first earthly beauty, or beautiful bodies. Then as a lover grows in wisdom, the beauty that is sought is spiritual, or beautiful souls. For Diotima, the most correct use of love of other human beings is to direct one's mind to love of wisdom, or philosophy.

From the Symposium Diotima's descriptor, "Mantinikê" (Mantinean) seems designed to draw attention to the word "mantis", which suggests an association with prophecy. She is further described as a foreigner (ξένη) (201e) and as wise (σοφὴ) in not only the subject of love but also of many other things (ἄλλα πολλά), she is often associated with priestcraft by a majority of scholars insofar as: 1 - she advises the Athenians on sacrifice (thusiai) which delayed the onset of a plague (201d), and 2 - her speech on eros utilizes the language of sacrifice (thusia), prophecy (mantike), purification (katharsis), mystical cultic practices like initiation (teletai) and culminates in revelations/visions (202e). In one manuscript her description was mistranscribed mantikê ('mantic woman' or seeress) rather than Mantinikê, which may be another reason for the reception of Diotima as a "priestess". Her views of love and beauty appear to center Socrates' lesson on the value of the daimonic (that which is between mortal and immortal) and "giving birth to the beautiful."

Historicity

Since there is no evidence for 'Diotima' outside Plato's Symposium, it has been doubted whether she was a real historical personage rather than a fictional creation.

As a fictional character
Marsilio Ficino, in the 15th century, was the first to suggest she might be fictional.  Believing Diotima to be a fiction, Martha Nussbaum notes that Diotima's name, which means "honor the god", stands in direct contrast to Timandra ("honor the man"),  who, according to Plutarch, was Alcibiades' consort.

As Aspasia
Plato was thought by some 19th and early 20th century scholars to have based Diotima on Aspasia, the companion of Pericles who famously impressed him by her intelligence and eloquence.  This identification was recently revived by Armand D'Angour.

As an independent figure
Mary Ellen Waithe has argued that Diotima could be an independent historical woman known for her intellectual accomplishments,  noting that in the Symposium, Diotima expounds ideas that are different from both Socrates's and Plato's, though with clear connections to both.

Notes

Further reading
Evans, N. (2006). Diotima and Demeter as Mystagogues in Plato’s Symposium. In: Hypatia, vol. 21, no. 2. 1-27.
Navia, Luis E., Socrates, the man and his philosophy, pp. 30, 171. University Press of America

External links
History of Women Philosophers and Scientiest (website) - a resource for scholarly work on Diotima.
Diotíma -  a resource for information on women, gender, sex, sexualities, race, ethnicity, class, status, masculinity, enslavement, disability, and the intersections among them in the ancient Mediterranean world.  

5th-century BC Greek women
5th-century BC philosophers
Ancient Mantineans
Ancient Greek ethicists
Ancient Greek seers
Ancient Greek priestesses
Ancient Greek women philosophers
Ancient Greek women writers
5th-century BC women writers
5th-century BC writers
Metic philosophers in Classical Athens
Philosophers of love
People whose existence is disputed
Dialogues of Plato
Year of birth unknown
Year of death unknown
5th-century BC clergy